Angelica Hernandez (born May 19, 1959) is a Mexican former luchadora, or female professional wrestler best known under the ring name Vicky Carranza. She is the daughter of professional wrestler Carraza I, the husband of retired wrestler Convoy. Carranza and Convoy have a son that have followed in their footsteps and also become a wrestler, known as Ricky.

During her career, Carranza won the Mexican National Women's Championship twice, as well as the Mexican National Women's Tag Team Championship with La Briosa.

Championships and accomplishments
Consejo Mundial de Lucha Libre
Mexican National Women's Championship (2 times)
Mexican National Women's Tag Team Championship (1 time) with La Briosa

References

1959 births
Living people
Mexican female professional wrestlers
20th-century professional wrestlers
21st-century professional wrestlers
Mexican National Women's Champions
Mexican National Women's Tag Team Champions